Arishem the Judge is a character appearing in American comic books published by Marvel Comics. Created by Jack Kirby, the character first appeared in The Eternals #2 (August 1976). Arishem is one of two Celestials who have the right and ability to judge which planet's civilization will live and which will die. Arishem's function is to act as the leader of Celestial landing parties and has led all Four Celestial Hosts on Earth.

Arishem debuted in the Marvel Cinematic Universe film Eternals (2021), voiced by David Kaye.

Publication history
Arishem the Judge first appeared in The Eternals #2 (August 1976), and was created by Jack Kirby.

Fictional character biography
Arishem first arrived on Earth-616 alongside other Celestials after the destruction of the sixth iteration of the cosmos to create a new one. Across their mission, Arishem and the Celestials encountered an eldritch god of darkness, Knull, ruler of the Void left by the destruction of the sixth iteration of the cosmos, who began a war against the Celestials. After witnessing the death of several Celestials, Arishem and the surviving Celestials decided to banish Knull into the Void.

Arishem arrived on Earth with the Fourth Celestial Host. During this time, he was first sighted by human beings, as he began his 50-year judgment of Earth. It was later revealed that during the Third Celestial Host, he had accepted the Earth Gods' vow of non-interference in Celestial affairs. With the other members of the Fourth Host in Peru, Arishem judged Earth worthy, and left Earth. Arishem led the Fourth Host on the planet called Pangoria, which he judged unworthy of life. With fellow Celestial Exitar, he began the purification process and transformed Pangoria into a virtual paradise. 

When the Second Host visited Earth, Arishem was responsible for the culling of the Deviants, causing the Great Cataclysm, also known as the Great Flood, that flooded the world. Arishem arrived to judge a distant planet on which X-Factor had been lost for some time. Arishem was attacked by the combined power of the Chosen, Rejects, and Beginagins factions; in response to this attack, he allowed the planet to live and the Celestials departed. Encountering the X-Men once again, the team tells Arishem and the other Celestials to leave.

Almost every Celestial, including Arishem, were killed when the Beyonders attacked the Multiverse. Arishem was later resurrected when the Queen of Nevers used the Celestial One Above All to restore all the Celestials.

When the Dark Celestials invaded the Earth to purge the planet, they attacked and killed Celestials, including Arishem, by infecting them with the Horde. The body of Arishem was sent to the Earth to herald the Dark Celestial's arrival, and it landed in London. During the Avengers' final stand against the Dark Celestials, the Horde reanimated the bodies of the fallen Celestials. To defeat the Horde, the Avengers merged their energies to form a Uni-Mind, rendering the Horde dormant with its power. The Celestials returned to life, and assisted the Avengers in taking down the Dark Celestials.

Powers and abilities
Like all of the other Celestials, Arishem is depicted as an extremely powerful cosmic being whose powers are rivaled by other cosmic entities. Arishem and fellow Celestials are immense beings with limitless strength and supernatural powers that transcend time and space, being able to manipulate cosmic energies, create new species, and eradicate life. Arishem has been described as an entity stronger than Odin, Zeus, and Vishnu combined. Like the other Celestials, Arishem is nigh-invulnerable and nigh-immortal. Celestials are able to regenerate lost limbs instantly. Celestials can be revived by their own kind, however, it only works if a Celestial has not been dead for too long. Compared to other Celestials, Arishem is only one of the two who have the right and power to exterminate an entire race.

Reception

Critical reception 
Saim Cheeda of CBR.com ranked Arishem 9th in their "Marvel's 20 Most Powerful Celestials" list.

In other media

Film 

 Arishem appears in Eternals, voiced by David Kaye. He is the Prime Celestial, credited for creating the first Sun and bringing light to the universe. His purpose is to expand the universe, which requires having to sacrifice lesser life forms to do so. Millions of years ago, Arishem created the Deviants to aid in Celestial births. But when his creations went rogue, the Judge created the race of Eternals using the World Forge to combat the Deviants who were interfering in his work. One such world Arishem sent his Eternals to was Earth to ensure the birth of Tiamut. Arishem communicated directly with Ajak on Earth. After her death at the hands of the Deviants, he instead made contact with Sersi, informing her of the Eternals' true purpose, the fact that the Eternals being from the planet Olympia was untrue, and to ensure the emergence takes place. However, the group grew attached to Earth and worked to stop the emergence and prevent the death of humanity. After they prevented the emergence, Arishem pulled Sersi, Kingo, and Phastos into space to study their memories and to judge if humanity was worth preserving, agreeing to spare the people of Earth if they are.

References

External links
 Arishem the Judge at Marvel Wiki

Characters created by Jack Kirby
Comics characters introduced in 1976
Fictional judges